A folwark was a large Polish farm.

Folwark may also refer to the following villages in Poland:
Folwark, Gniezno County in Greater Poland Voivodeship (west-central Poland)
Folwark, Rawicz County in Greater Poland Voivodeship (west-central Poland) 
Folwark, Łódź Voivodeship (central Poland)
Folwark, Otwock County in Masovian Voivodeship (east-central Poland)
Folwark, Opole Voivodeship (south-west Poland)
Folwark, Pomeranian Voivodeship (north Poland)